The Aquitaine Progression is a novel by Robert Ludlum originally published in 1984.

Plot summary

Joel Converse is a lawyer, having previously been a fighter pilot in the Vietnam War. Because of his wartime experiences with Command Saigon, in the form of a psychopathic general named "Mad" Marcus Delavane, he is chosen to thwart a cabal of former generals bent on world domination.

The Generals
Erich Leifhelm, a former Field Marshal from Nazi Germany, who ingratiated himself with the West after the defeat of Hitler.
Chaim Abrams, a tough-as-nails sabra, a hero to Israeli independence.
Jacques-Louis Bertholdier, a hero of the French Resistance who revels in his past as an assistant to De Gaulle.
Jan van Headmer, a South African general known as the "slayer of Soweto."
George Marcus Delavane, a bloodthirsty U.S. general from the Vietnam war.

Publication history

1984, US, Random House , Pub date February 12, 1984, Hardback
1985, US, Bantam Books , Pub date February 1, 1985, Paperback
1984, UK, Grafton  Pub date March 1984, Hardback
1999, UK, HarperCollins , Pub date January 4, 1999, Paperback

1984 American novels
Novels by Robert Ludlum